Year 1320 (MCCCXX) was a leap year starting on Tuesday (link will display the full calendar) of the Julian calendar.

Events 
 By place 

 Europe 
 January 20 – Duke Władysław I (the Short) becomes king of a reunited Poland, after receiving the approval from Pope John XXII. He is crowned, along with his wife Jadwiga of Kalisz, at the royal cathedral on Wawel Hill at Kraków. Wladysław's kingdom is surrounded by three hostile neighbors: Brandenburg, the Teutonic Order and Bohemia. Looking for allies, he makes an alliance with Charles I, ruler of Hungary. To strengthen the alliance, in accordance with John XXII, Charles marries his fourth wife, Władysław's 15-year-old daughter Elizabeth of Poland on July 6.  
 June – Shepherds' Crusade: A large group of common folk bands together to preach a crusade, after a teenage shepherd says he is visited by the Holy Spirit. They march south to Aquitaine, attacking castles, royal officials, priests and lepers along the way. Jewish communes are attacked at Saintes, Cahors, Verdun-sur-Garonne, Albi and Toulouse. When they finally crossed into Spain, Aragon forces under Prince Alfonso halt their advance. In July, many of the followers are arrested and executed. After that, there were no further incidents and the crusade dispersed.
 June 18 – Treaty of Baena: Sultan Ismail I signs an 8-year truce with Castile at Baena. King James II (the Just), who receives papal authorization and funds for a crusade against Granada refuses to accept the treaty. Both parties promise to aid one another against their respective enemies. Meanwhile, Ismail consolidates the territories formally under his control with the emirate.
 September 9 – Battle of Saint George: Byzantine forces under Andronikos Asen defeat the army of the Principality of Achaea, securing the possession of Arcadia. During the battle, Latin commander Bartholomew II is taken prisoner, along with several high-ranking nobles of the principality, and is sent to Constantinople.Ravegnano, Giorgio (2000). "GHISI, Bartolomeo". Dizionario Biografico degli Italiani, Volume 54: Ghiselli-Gimma (in Italian). Rome: Istituto dell'Enciclopedia Italiana. .
 Battle of Rhodes: The Knights Hospitaller defeats an attempt by the Turks of Menteshe to capture Rhodes. During the battle, a Turkish invasion fleet (some 80 ships) is destroyed by a smaller Hospitaller-Genoese fleet.
 Autumn – Byzantine forces under Andronikos Asen capture the Latin castles of Akova and Karytaina. They secure control over Arcadia and Cynuria in the Peloponnese.

 England 
 April 6 – Declaration of Arbroath: King Robert I (the Bruce) sends a letter to John XXII. He asks him to recognize Scottish sovereignty, and Robert's right to be ruler of Scotland. Hoping that he will lift the ex-communication order under which Robert is being held for the death of John Comyn III (the Red) (see 1306).McLean, Iain (2005). State of the Union: Unionism and the Alternatives in the United Kingdom Since 1707, p. 247. Oxford University Press. .

 Asia 
 July 9 – Sultan Qutbuddin Mubarak Shah is murdered by his favourite, Khusrau Khan, who succeeds him on the throne. Later, Khusrau Khan himself is murdered by his governor Ghiyath al-Din Tughluq, who succeeds him as ruler of the newly founded Tughlaq Dynasty of the Delhi Sultanate. He appoints military governors in Punjab and Sindh province, who manage to halt Mongol incursions towards the sultanate.  

 By topic 

 Architecture 
 The Venetian Arsenal, a dockyard for naval ships, is rebuilt, known as the Arsenale Nuovo.

 Literature 
 Henri de Mondeville, French surgeon and physician, writes La Chirurgie, the first textbook on surgery by a Frenchmen.

Births 
  April 8 – Peter I (the Cruel), king of Portugal (d. 1367)
 May 25 – Toghon Temür, Mongol emperor (d. 1370)
 date unknown
 Blanka of Namur, queen of Norway and Sweden (d. 1363)
 Chen Youliang, Chinese founder of Chen Han (d. 1363)
 Lalleshwari (or Lal Ded), Indian mystic and poet (d. 1392)
 Louis I, king of Naples (Capetian House of Anjou) (d. 1362)
 Michael Panaretos, Byzantine historian and writer (d. 1390)
 Nissim of Gerona, Spanish talmudist and scholar (d. 1380)
 Bertrand du Guesclin, Breton knight and general (d. 1380)

Deaths 
 January 12 – John Dalderby, English bishop and chancellor
 January 21 – Árni Helgason, Icelandic cleric and bishop (b. 1260) 
 February 7 – Jan Muskata, Polish bishop and chancellor (b. 1250)
 March 1 – Ayurbarwada Buyantu Khan, Mongol emperor (b. 1285)
 April 13 – Margaret of Castello, Italian nun and teacher (b. 1287)
 April 24 – Abu Said Faraj, Nasrid advisor and governor (b. 1248)
 May 2 – Joan Butler (or FitzGerald), Irish noblewoman (b. 1281)
 May 29 – John VIII, Egyptian pope of the Coptic Orthodox Church 
 June 5 – Peter of Aspelt, German priest, chancellor and archbishop 
 July 9 – Qutbuddin Mubarak Shah, Indian ruler of the Delhi Sultanate
 July 27 – Heinrich von Plötzke, German knight and marshal (b. 1264)
 October 12 – Michael IX (Palaiologos), Byzantine emperor (b. 1277)
 October 31 – Ricold of Monte Croce, Italian missionary and writer
 date unknown
 Alessandro Novello, Italian bishop and inquisitor (b. 1250)
 Anna Palaiologina, Byzantine princess and queen consort
 Antonius Andreas, Spanish monk and theologian (b. 1280)
 Arnaud d'Aux, French bishop and cardinal-bishop (b. 1270)
 Bernard Délicieux, French monk, prior and priest (b. 1260)
 Chosgi Odsir, Mongol monk, translator and writer (b. 1260)
 Dominic II Rátót, Hungarian nobleman, knight and palatine
 Geoffrey of Paris, French monk, chronicler and historian
 Henri de Mondeville, French surgeon and physician
 Henry II (the Child), German nobleman and co-ruler
 Ilbasan (or Erzen), Mongol ruler (House of Borjigin)
 Li Kan (or Zhong Bin), Chinese official and painter
 Mojs II Ákos, Hungarian nobleman and rebel leader
 Nicholas de Balscote, English judge and chancellor
 Olivier III de Clisson, Breton nobleman and co-ruler
 Radulphus Brito, French grammarian and philosopher
 Roger de Mowbray, Scottish nobleman and landowner

References